Andorran may refer to:
 Something of, or related to Andorra, the European microstate
 A person from Andorra or of Andorran descent; see List of Andorrans
 Andorran cuisine
 A resident of Andorra, Teruel, Spain

See also 
 
 Andorian, a fictional extraterrestrial race in the Star Trek franchise

Language and nationality disambiguation pages